Marko Kolaković (born 9 February 1993) is a Serbian football defender who plays for Uzbekistani club Sogdiana Jizzakh.

Professional career
Kolaković made his professional career debut in 2011–12 season with his hometown club Javor Ivanjica, after spending the entire youth career with the club. In winter's transfer window of 2012–13 season, he was loaned to fourth-tier Serbian League West club Rudar Kostolac where he stayed for one year. In winter's transfer window of 2013–14 season, he rejoined Javor Ivanjica.

In 2014–15 season, he became the team starter, appearing in 26 games of the 2014–15 Serbian First League season. In the coming seasons, he became team's captain.

In winter's transfer window of 2019–20 season, Kolaković signed a contract with the Uzbekistan Super League club Sogdiana Jizzakh.

Career statistics

References

External links
 
 Marko Kolaković at utakmica.rs

1993 births
Living people
People from Ivanjica
Association football defenders
Serbian footballers
FK Javor Ivanjica players
Serbian First League players
Serbian SuperLiga players
Serbian expatriate footballers
Expatriate footballers in Uzbekistan
Serbian expatriate sportspeople in Uzbekistan